The Australian Rail Tram and Bus Industry Union (RTBU) is an Australian trade union representing rail, tram and bus workers. The RTBU is affiliated with the Australian Council of Trade Unions (ACTU) and the Australian Labor Party (ALP).

Internationally, the RTBU is affiliated with the International Transport Workers' Federation. It has a membership of 31,223 as at 31 December 2018.

History

The union was formed on 1 March 1993 as the Public Transport Union (PTU) through the amalgamation of four long-standing transport unions: the Australian Railways Union, the Australian Federated Union of Locomotive Employees, the Australian Tramway and Motor Omnibus Employees' Association and the National Union of Rail Workers of Australia. The amalgamation effectively created one union for public transport workers for the first time in Australia. It adopted its current name in 1998.

Structure 
It is organised into National Divisions, covering Infrastructure; Rail Operations; Tram and Bus; Locomotive; Workshops and Salaried and Professional. There are seven state branches, with the National Office located in Sydney:

 New South Wales
 Queensland
 Western Australia
 South Australia and Northern Territory
 Victoria
 Tasmania

See also 

 Rail Tram and Bus Union (Qld Branch)
 Rail Tram and Bus Union (NSW Branch)
 Railway trade unions in Australia
 Australian Rail Tram and Bus Union (Victorian branch)

External links 
 
 RTBU (Queensland Branch)

References

Transport trade unions in Australia
International Transport Workers' Federation
1993 establishments in Australia
Trade unions established in 1993
Australian Public Sector Trade Unions